Hengchun is a township in Pingtung County, Taiwan.
Hengchun may also refer to:

Hengchun Airport, an airport 
Hengchun Old Town, a historic site

See also 
Hengchun earthquake (disambiguation)